The Commercial Bank of Australia Limited (CBA) was an Australian and New Zealand retail bank which operated from 1866 until being amalgamated with the Bank of New South Wales, that was established in 1817, to form the Westpac Banking Corporation in 1982.

History
The Commercial Bank of Australia was established in 1866. Lake and Reynolds write that Lowe Kong Meng and Louis Ah Mouy were "founding director(s) and major shareholder(s) of the Commercial Bank of Australia." As banks could issue their own paper currency at the time, the bank printed Chinese text on their pound note to encourage Chinese custom.

It was headquartered for its entire existence at what is now 327-343 Collins Street, Melbourne. The Commercial Bank of Australia Building, was rebuilt in 1891-93, at which time a dramatic banking chamber was added, and redeveloped again in 1939, when the Collins Street facade was rebuilt. The building was substantially demolished as part of the construction of the 333 Collins Street tower in 1990; however, the facade, banking chamber and entrance vestibule were preserved, the latter two now being heritage-listed.

Acquisition
It acquired the Australian and European Bank in 1879 and the National Bank of Tasmania in 1918. It commenced operations in New Zealand in 1912.

Amalgamation
It amalgamated with the Bank of New South Wales to form Westpac in 1982.

Further reading

 *Westpac: The Bank that Broke the Bank, Edna Carew, Doubleday, 1997, paperback .

References 

Defunct banks of Australia
Defunct banks of New Zealand
Australian companies established in 1866
Banks established in 1866
Banks disestablished in 1982
Australian companies disestablished in 1982